Vestnesavisa (The Vestnes Gazette) is a local Norwegian newspaper published in Vestnes in Møre og Romsdal county. 

The newspaper was established in 1987. It is managed by Jon Ragnar Halkjelsvik and edited by Helene Henriksen. Vestnesavisa appears once a week, on Wednesdays.

Circulation
According to the Norwegian Audit Bureau of Circulations and National Association of Local Newspapers, Vestnesavisa has had the following annual circulation:
2004: 1,922
2005: 1,902
2006: 1,933
2007: 1,935
2008: 1,909
2009: 1,956
2010: 1,934
2011: 1,926
2012: 1,900
2013: 1,859
2014: 1,851
2015: 1,827
2016: 1,741

References

External links
Vestnesavisa homepage

Newspapers published in Norway
Norwegian-language newspapers
Vestnes
Mass media in Møre og Romsdal
Publications established in 1987
1987 establishments in Norway